John Cuthbertson may refer to:
 John Cuthbertson (instrument maker) (1743–1821), English instrument maker living in the Netherlands from 1768 to 1796
 John Cuthbertson (politician) (1834–1882), politician from New Zealand
 John Cuthbertson (footballer, fl. 1939–56), Scottish footballer
 John Cuthbertson (footballer, born 1932), Scottish footballer for Mansfield Town
 John Cuthbertson (cricketer) (born 1942), English cricketer
 John Cuthbertson (Covenanter), Covenanter minister
 John Cuthbertson, see The Last Confession of Alexander Pearce